Pathargatti is a boulevard constructed of stone located at Madina center in Hyderabad.

History
It was built during the time of the last Nizam of Hyderabad State, Mir Osman Ali Khan. As the building was constructed in stone or Pathar, it was named Pathargatti. It was designed by the renowned engineer Vishveshwaraiah in a distinctive Osmanian architecture style.
Pathergatti is the main Business hub in Hyderabad for past one century.

References

Hyderabad State
Buildings and structures in Hyderabad, India